Pearlie Kennedy Pettway (1920–1982) was an American quilter. She was among the quilters of Gee's Bend. Her works are in the Metropolitan Museum of Art.

Pearlie Kennedy was born in Boykin, Alabama (Gee's Bend) in 1920. She had a brother, Herman Kennedy. She married Horace Pettway, who was the brother of her brother's wife, Mary Elizabeth Pettway.

Pettway created her Triangles quilt around 1960. The quilt, also known as Triangles Creating Squares-within-Squares (Housetop) Motif, is made from cotton sacking material. It is included in the collection of the Metropolitan Museum of Art, a gift of the Souls Grown Deep Foundation in 2014. Once clothing was no longer able to be mended, Pettway would use the material from coverall pants, dresses, and skirts to create quilts. Her quilt Bars, made  1950, was crafted using cotton and denim work-clothes. According to her daughter Florida Irby, Pettway also sewed clothing using 25 lb. flour sacks and cloth that she acquired in Camden, using the leftover fabric to make quilts.

Pettway died in 1982 in Boykin.

References

External links
Pearlie Kennedy Pettway, Souls Grown Deep Foundation.

1920 births
1982 deaths
American quilters
20th-century textile artists
20th-century American women artists
20th-century women textile artists
People from Wilcox County, Alabama
African-American women artists
20th-century African-American women
20th-century African-American artists